Polyvalence or polyvalent may refer to:

Polyvalency (chemistry), chemical species, generally atoms or molecules, which exhibit more than one chemical valence
Polyvalence (music), the musical use of more than one harmonic function of a tonality simultaneously
Polyvalent antibody, a group of antibodies that have affinity for various antigens
Polyvalent logic, a form of many-valued logic or probabilistic logic
Polyvalent vaccine, a vaccine that can vaccinate a person against more than one strain of a disease
Sala Polivalentă (disambiguation), various stadiums in Romania commonly translated as Polyvalent Hall
Snake antivenom that contains neutralizing antibodies against two or more species of snakes

See also
Bivalence, principle in logic that every declaration is either true or false
Monovalence (disambiguation)
Valence (disambiguation)